Thomas Burman (1618–1674) was a 17th century English sculptor based in London.

Life
Born in London in 1618 of Jewish parentage he was indentured as a bound apprentice to mason and sculptor Edward Marshall in 1633. He began working independently around 1640.

Around 1650 he took on John Bushnell as an apprentice who proved a worthy student. Andre Charles Boulle also studied under him.

He died on 17 March 1674 in the parish of St Martin's and is buried in the churchyard of St Paul's in Covent Garden in central London.

Family

He was married to Rebekeh (Rebecca). They had a son Balthasar Burman who was also a sculptor - his most notable work being the tomb of Bishop Brian Duppa in Westminster Abbey.

Known Works
Statue of Anna Talbot, Countess of Shrewsbury (1671) at St. John's College, Cambridge
Fireplace for Sir Robert Clayton's banking house (1671) in Old Jewry
Memorial to John Dutton in Church of St Mary Magdalene in Sherborne
Memorial to Mrs and Rev Beale (1672) at Walton, Buckinghamshire
Memorial to John Ashburnham (1672) in the parish church of Ashburnham, East Sussex

References
 

1618 births
1674 deaths
British sculptors